Trócaire (meaning "compassion") is the official overseas development agency of the Catholic Church in Ireland.

History
The roots of the charity lie in Pope Paul VI's 1967 encyclical Populorum Progressio, which called for people to take notice and respond to the injustices that were occurring all round the world. Then, in response to the 1973 floods which ravaged Bangladesh, Cardinal William Conway saw the need for a church agency which would co-ordinate charitable donations originating in Ireland. Trócaire's life began with a pastoral letter written in the same year by the Bishops of Ireland. In it, they set out the aims of Trócaire:

The headquarters of Trócaire are in St. Patrick's College, Maynooth, County Kildare.

Ethos
Trócaire works in 127 programmes across 20 countries in Africa, Latin America and the Middle East. The aims of the charity's programmes include supporting gender equality, responding to emergencies and disasters, and addressing the HIV and AIDS crisis. According to Trócaire's 2020 annual report, the charity's programme work benefitted over 2.5 million people.

Overseas, Trócaire works across a number of programme areas and delivers support through local partner organisations and churches, with the goal of helping communities and families to free themselves from poverty, cope with climate change, promote gender equality, tackle injustice, provide emergency relief and defend human rights.

In Ireland, the charity seeks to raise awareness about the causes of poverty through outreach programmes in the education sector, through parish networks, and through public campaigns and advocacy work.

Activities

In 1982, Trócaire worker Sally O’Neill and Michael D. Higgins (who would later be elected President of Ireland) visited El Salvador to investigate the 1981 El Mozote massacre, in which the Salvadoran Army killed more than 800 civilians. In 1984, Bishop Eamonn Casey, then chairman of Trócaire, refused to meet Ronald Reagan during the president's visit to Ireland, as a protest against the United States government's support of the Salvadoran military. O’Neill also worked in Ethiopia during the famine in the mid-1980s and played a central role in Trócaire's response to the famine in Somalia in the early 1990s.

In response to the 2004 Indian Ocean earthquake disaster, the organisation raised a record €27.5 million through church collections, street collections, and private donations.

In September 2015, Trócaire applauded the Irish Government's decision to receive 4,000 refugees into Ireland.

Fundraising
Trócaire each year runs a fundraising appeal during Lent, with Trócaire boxes distributed through churches and schools, then collected after Easter. The 2015 appeal raised about €8.3million

References

External links

Development charities based in the Republic of Ireland
Caritas Internationalis
CIDSE
St Patrick's College, Maynooth
1973 establishments in Ireland
Organizations established in 1973